Ping-ti Ho or Bingdi He (1917–2012), who also wrote under the name P.T. Ho, was a Chinese-American historian. He wrote widely on China's history, including works on demography, plant history, ancient archaeology, and contemporary events. He taught at University of Chicago for most of his career, and was president of the Association for Asian Studies in 1975, the first scholar of Asian descent to have that honor.

Biography
Ho's ancestral hometown is Jinhua, Zhejiang Province, and was born in Tianjin in 1917. In 1934, Ho studied at the Department of History of Tsinghua University in Beijing, then he went to Shanghai studying at Kwang Hua University temporarily due to the Second Sino-Japanese War, and graduated in Tsinghua with a BA in 1938. After graduation, Ho went to Yunnan in southwestern China during the Second Sino-Japanese War, and became a teaching assistant at the Department of History of the National Southwestern Associated University (a university temporarily jointed by the Peking University, Tsinghua University and Nankai University, during the war). In 1944, Ho won and obtained financial support from the Sixth Boxer Indemnity Scholarship, and went to study in the United States in 1945.

Ho entered Columbia University in New York City, and graduated with a PhD in history in 1952. His doctoral dissertation concerned British history in the 19th century. Ho had already taught at the University of British Columbia in Vancouver, British Columbia of Canada. In 1963, Ho went to teach at the University of Chicago. In 1965, Ho was promoted to the James Westfall Thompson Professor of History at the University of Chicago. Ho retired from Chicago in 1987, but he soon became the Visiting Distinguished Professor of History and Social Sciences at the University of California, Irvine, where he retired for the second time in 1990.

Ho was elected as an academician of Academia Sinica in 1966, a member of American Academy of Arts and Sciences in 1979, and an honorary member of the Chinese Academy of Social Sciences in 1997. Ho was also "the first Asian-born scholar ever to have been elected as President of the Association for Asian Studies".

Ho received several honorary doctorates, including the L.L.D. from the Chinese University of Hong Kong in 1975, the L.H.D. from Lawrence University in 1978, and the L.H.D. from Denison University in 1988.

Historiographical debates
He forcefully attacked the school now known as the New Qing History in his exchange with Evelyn Rawski in 1996. He argued, following the Harvard school of John King Fairbank, that the Manchu rulers had become "sinicized" and did not have a distinctive non-Chinese approach. He said sinicization was not incompatible with the politics of a multiethnic empire, yet to reject sinicization is to deny a fundamental force in Chinese history.  Xin Fan examines the intensity of Ho's passionate attacks on the New Qing History in the 1990s. He argues that Ho was a cultural exile in two ways. He taught far from his homeland and never fully Identified with the United States. That sort of exile intensified his  nationalistic pride for China. He had terrible memories of the Sino-Japanese War. The new historiography was based on Manchu-language sources—Not Chinese language sources—and seemed to him to be an echo of the Japanese wartime imperialistic project of Manchuristic studies.

His cousin Ho Ping-sung was also a famous historian in China.

Publications 
 Major books
 Studies on the Population of China, 1368–1953 (1959)
 The Ladder of Success in Imperial China, Aspects of Social Mobility, 1368–1911 (1962)
 
 The Cradle of the East: An Inquiry into the Indigenous Origins of Techniques and Ideas of Neolithic and Early Historic China, 5000–1000 B.C. (1975)
 

 Major articles
 
 "Aspects of social mobility in China, 1368-1911." Comparative Studies in Society and History' 1.4 (1959): 330-359. online
 
 

 References 
 Citations 

 Sources 

 Fan, Xin. "The anger of Ping-Ti Ho: the Chinese nationalism of a double exile." Storia della storiografia'' 69.1 (2016): 147–160.

External links
 Ping-ti Ho, renowned scholar of China, 1917–2012
 Ping-ti Ho: 我与胡适的交往 (My friendship with Hu Shih)

Educators from Tianjin
1917 births
2012 deaths
American historians
Republic of China (1912–1949) emigrants to the United States
Tsinghua University alumni
Columbia Graduate School of Arts and Sciences alumni
Academic staff of the University of British Columbia
University of Chicago faculty
University of California, Irvine faculty
Boxer Indemnity Scholarship recipients
Members of Academia Sinica
Writers from Tianjin
Presidents of the Association for Asian Studies
Academic staff of the National Southwestern Associated University